Mohammad Aminul Islam (born 1 April 1975), also known as Bhola, is a former Bangladeshi cricketer, who played in one ODI in 1999.

Islam played for the Rajshahi Division first-class side through 2003/2004, taking 71 wickets in 25 matches, with an average of 22.19. Islam's best innings was 6/57, and his best batting innings was 52 (his only half-century).

References

1975 births
Bangladesh One Day International cricketers
Bangladeshi cricketers
Rajshahi Division cricketers
Living people
People from Rajshahi District